Benno Schotz (28 August 1891 Arensburg, Livonia, Russian Empire – 11 October 1984 Glasgow, Scotland) was an Estonian-born Scottish sculptor, and one of twentieth century Scotland's leading artists.

Biography

Early life
Schotz was the youngest of six children of Jewish parents, Jacob Schotz, a watchmaker, and Cherna Tischa Abramovitch. He was educated at the Boys Grammar School of Pärnu, Estonia. Later he studied at the Grossherzogliche Technische Hochschule in Darmstadt, Germany.

In 1912, he immigrated to Glasgow, where he gained an engineering diploma from the Royal Technical College. From 1914 to 1923 he worked in the drawing office of John Brown & Company, a Clydebank shipbuilders, while attending evening classes in sculpture at the Glasgow School of Art.

Artistic career
Schotz became a full-time sculptor in 1923. An important early patron was the Dundee art collector William Boyd, thanks to whose influence both Dundee Dental School and Dundee Art Galleries & Museums hold pieces by him. From this point onwards his reputation grew and he became a full member of the Royal Scottish Academy, head of sculpture at the Glasgow School of Art (a post he held from 1938 until his retirement in 1961), and eventually was appointed the Sculptor in Ordinary for Scotland in 1963. His pupils included the artists Hannah Frank,  Stewart Bowman Johnson, and  Inge King (née Neufeld).

His homes at West Campbell Street and later Kirklee Road were a focus for meetings of artists, writers, actors, and politicians. He was also a member of Glasgow Art Club. He also helped refugees such as Jankel Adler and Josef Herman.

He was a committed Zionist, and also proud of his adopted Scotland. He worked until a few weeks before his death at the age of 93. He was buried in Jerusalem.

He was made a Freeman of the City of Glasgow in 1981. In that same year, Gordon Wright published his autobiography, Bronze in My Blood.

Work 
During his career, Schotz produced several hundred portraits and compositions including figure compositions, religious sculptures, semi-abstracts and modelled portraits. His bust of James Maxton is on public display at the Maxton remembrance garden in Barrhead near Paisley. Other publicly accessible work includes:
 Memorial to Provost John Jarvie of Kilsyth, first freeman of the burgh, commissioned in 1954 is a portrait in relief and can be seen in John Jarvie Square, off East Burnside Street, Kilsyth.
 The Psalmist (1974) in the T J Honeyman Memorial Garden of Kelvingrove Park,
 the Joseph Black Memorial (1953) at the University of Glasgow,
 the statues of Saints Margaret and Ninian on the front of the 1929-31 (former) Bank of Scotland building on Sauchiehall St,
 the Painting and Sculpture reliefs on the Mercat Building (1928–29) and
 the Stations of the Cross sculptures in St. Charles' Parish Church North Kelvinside.
 the Crucifix in St Columba's Church, Woodside, Glasgow
 Ex Terra in Glenrothes town centre next to the bus station
bust of James Pittendrigh Macgillivray, Scottish National Portrait Gallery (1924)
 busts of William Boyd, Mrs William Rettie and William Tattersall in Dundee Dental Hospital & School, University of Dundee
 a bust of William Boyd's daughter Joan at The McManus: Dundee's Art Gallery & Museum
 bust of Keir Hardie, People's Palace, Glasgow
 eleven foot high sculpture 'The Window on the World', Vale of Leven Academy Alexandria.

The majority of these works were all in Glasgow and the surrounding area. He was responsible for the repair on the bridge sculpture at Kelvingrove Park beside the now refurbished art gallery and museum.

Although Benno Schotz is frequently referred to as an Estonian sculptor, all his professional life was in Scotland. He became a naturalised British subject in 1930.
He became a full member of the Royal Scottish Academy, 1937. He headed the Sculpture and Ceramics dept. of the Glasgow School of Art from 1938 until his retirement in 1960. His active life as a sculptor continued thereafter with renewed vigor and he created his most ambitious and monumental works over the next 20 years. 
In 1963, he was appointed The Sculptor in Ordinary for Scotland, a member of the Royal household. 
A major retrospective exhibition of his works (1971) was held at the Royal Scottish Academy, Edinburgh.
His interest in the drawing of trees developed, the drawings becoming more and more complex and abstract. He mounted a successful exhibition of Sculptures and Related Drawings in Glasgow (1961). His last sculpture was executed less than six weeks before his death, aged 93.
He was Life-President of the Royal Glasgow Institute of the Fine Arts.
Honors include: Freedom of the City of Glasgow; Honorary Fellow of The Hebrew University; Honorary LL.D, Strathclyde University; Honorary Member of the British Society of British Sculptors; Honorary Member of the Royal Institute of Architects in Scotland.
Source: his daughter, Mrs. S.C. Crome, and son, Mr. A. M Schotz.

Books
Schotz wrote at least one book: Bronze in My Blood, a memoir of his life.

References

Further reading 
 Jonathan Blackwood, "Benno Schotz: Unknown Estonian Sculptor", kunst.ee. Autumn 2007, Tallinn
 Benno Schotz, Bronze In My Blood (Edinburgh: Gordon Wright, 1981)
 Hugh T. Stevenson, "Schotz, Benno (1891–1984)", Oxford Dictionary of National Biography, Oxford University Press, 2004 accessed 29 July 2007

External links

1891 births
1984 deaths
People from Kuressaare
People from the Governorate of Livonia
Estonian Jews
Emigrants from the Russian Empire to the United Kingdom
Estonian engineers
20th-century Estonian sculptors
20th-century Scottish engineers
Scottish scholars and academics
Scottish sculptors
Scottish male sculptors
Artists from Glasgow
Jewish artists
Royal Scottish Academicians
20th-century British sculptors
Estonian emigrants to Scotland
Academics of the Glasgow School of Art
Alumni of the Royal College of Science and Technology